"Geile Zeit" is a song by German band Juli. It was written by band members Simon Triebel and Jonas Pfetzing and produced by Andreas Herbig for their debut album Es ist Juli (2004).

In 2005, Juli and the song represented Hesse in the Bundesvision Song Contest 2005, placing first with 159 points.

Formats and track listings

Charts

Weekly charts

Year-end charts

References

2004 singles
Juli (band) songs
2004 songs
Songs written by Simon Triebel
German-language songs